Talang, formerly named Talang Sverige (English: Talent Sweden) in 2014, is the Swedish version of the Got Talent series show where singers, dancers, comedians, variety acts and other performers compete against each other for audience support and the prize money (1 million SEK in 2007 and 2014; 500,000 SEK between 2008 and 2011 and since 2017).

History 
The show was broadcast for five seasons on TV4, between 2007 and 2011, before TV4 put the show on indefinite hiatus. Two years later, on 19 June 2013, TV3 announced that they had acquired the rights for the show and would re-launch the show in spring 2014 under the name Talang Sverige. After another 2 years without a season, in 2017, TV4 acquired the rights for the show once again and re-launched the show under the original name, Talang.

Hosts and judges 
Key:  Previous   Latest  Replaced Carolina Gynning in the final

Season summary

References

External links 
 
 

 
2007 Swedish television series debuts
Swedish reality television series
TV3 (Sweden) original programming
TV4 (Sweden) original programming
Television series by Fremantle (company)
Swedish television series based on British television series